Antônio Lino da Silva Dinis (São Mateus de Oliveira, 22 February 1943 − Goiânia, 1 December 2013) was a Portuguese-born Brazilian Roman Catholic bishop.

Ordained to the priesthood on 15 August 1966, Lino da Silva Dinis was named bishop of the Roman Catholic Diocese of Itumbiara, Brazil on 24 February 1999 and died while still in office on 1 December 2013.

References

1943 births
2013 deaths
People from Vila Nova de Famalicão
21st-century Roman Catholic bishops in Brazil
Portuguese Roman Catholic priests
Roman Catholic bishops of Itumbiara